Barkly Stock Route is a designated state route in the Northern Territory of Australia. Forming part of State Route 16, it connects the Stuart Highway near Elliott with the Tablelands Highway and Cresswell Road.

Upgrades
The Northern Australia Beef Roads Program announced in 2016 included the following project for the Barkly Stock Route.

Road upgrading
The project to upgrade a section to a two-lane standard seal was completed in late 2019 at a total cost of $13.7 million.

See also

References

Roads in the Northern Territory